Hung Leng is a village of Hong Kong, located in Fanling, North District. Part of the village is a historic walled village.

Administration
Hung Leng is a recognized village under the New Territories Small House Policy. It is a recognized village under the New Territories Small House Policy. It is one of the villages represented within the Fanling District Rural Committee. For electoral purposes, Hung Leng is part of the Queen's Hill constituency, which is currently represented by Law Ting-tak.

History
Hung Leng was historically a Punti walled village founded by members of the Hau clan. It was called Kuk Fung Leng at that time.

Hung Leng was served by the Hung Leng station of the former Sha Tau Kok Railway, which was in operation from 1911 to 1928. Hung Leng station was opened on 21 December 1911.

Features
The Hung Shing Temple of Hung Leng was probably built in 1763. It is the centre of the Four Yeuk (four villages alliance), namely Loi Tung, Lung Yeuk Tau, Lin Ma Hang and Tan Chuk Hang.

References

External links

 Delineation of area of existing village Hung Leng (Fanling) for election of resident representative (2019 to 2022)
 Antiquities Advisory Board. Historic Building Appraisal. Hung Leng Station, Fanling-Sha Tau Kok Branch Line Pictures
 Antiquities Advisory Board. Pictures of Hung Shing Temple, Hung Leng

Walled villages of Hong Kong
Fanling
Villages in North District, Hong Kong